Andrew Thomas is an American former professional ice hockey defenseman. He won a National Championships with Denver in 2005.

Playing career
After helping the Waterloo Black Hawks win the Clark Cup, Thomas began his college career in the fall of 2004. He joined the program at Denver just in time to help the Pioneers repeat at national champions. After the season, Thomas was selected by the Washington Capitals in the 2005 NHL Entry Draft. The hard-nosed defenseman remained at Denver for four years, and was routinely among the most penalized players on the team. During his senior season, Thomas served as team captain and helped the club both win the WCHA championship and make the NCAA tournament.

After graduating with a degree in business administration, Thomas signed with the Anaheim Ducks organization and split his first year as a professional between the AHL and ECHL. The following year he joined the New Jersey Devils farm system and spent most of the next three seasons playing AA-hockey. In 2012, Thomas travelled to Europe. He played one season for HDD Olimpija Ljubljana, serving as an assistant captain. The club finished outside the postseason for the Austrian League but did manage to win the Slovenian championship. The next year, Thomas played for Orli Znojmo and, while the team performed much better, the club flamed out in the first round. After the year, Thomas retired as a player.

Post playing career
Thomas returned to North America and signed on as a Hockey Operations Coordinator with Rensselaer but remained with the program for just one season. Thomas moved to the Boston area and worked for College Hockey Inc. for about a year before moving away from the sport taking a position as a project manager with J. Calnan & Associates, a construction company. He has worked for several firms in the years since and currently is a Manager for Hudl (as of 2022).

Career statistics

References

External links

1985 births
Living people
American men's ice hockey defensemen
Ice hockey people from New Hampshire
People from Bow, New Hampshire
Waterloo Black Hawks players
Denver Pioneers men's ice hockey players
NCAA men's ice hockey national champions
Bakersfield Condors (1998–2015) players
Iowa Stars players
Trenton Devils players
Lowell Devils players
Albany Devils players
Trenton Titans players
Adirondack Phantoms players
Binghamton Senators players
Syracuse Crunch players
HDD Olimpija Ljubljana players
Orli Znojmo players
Washington Capitals draft picks
American expatriate ice hockey players in Slovenia
American expatriate ice hockey players in the Czech Republic